The British Crown dependency of Guernsey was represented in the 2006 Commonwealth Games in Melbourne by a 28-member strong contingent, comprising 28 sportspersons and no officials.  They competed in 8 sports, including athletics, badminton, cycling, lawn bowls, shooting, squash, swimming, and triathlon.  They won no medals.

Medals

Guernsey's Commonwealth Games Team 2006

Athletics
 Dale Garland, Decathlon & 400 m Hurdles
 Lee Merrien, 800 m & 1500 m

Badminton
 Elena Johnson & Paul Le Tocq, Mixed Doubles

Cycling
 Rob Smart, Mountain Bike
 Tobyn Horton, Road Race

Lawn bowls
 Alison Merrien
 Matt Le Ber
 Ian Merrien
 Paul Merrien
 Alan Merrien

Shooting
 Peter Jory & Adam Jory, Full Bore Rifle Pairs
 Nick Dewe & Stefan Roberts, Skeet

Squash
 Chris Simpson

Swimming
 Ben Lowndes – Freestyle, Butterfly and Individual Medley
 Jonathon Le Noury – 1500 m, 200 m and 100 m Freestyle
 Ian Powell – Backstroke, Butterfly and Individual Medley
 Gail Strobridge – Breaststroke and Individual Medley
 Thomas Hollingsworth, Jeremy Osborne, Jonathon Le Noury, & Ian Hubert -  Relay team

Triathlon
 Samantha Herridge
 Alan Rowe
 Damian Thacker
 Ian Le Pelley

Source
 Guernsey Commonwealth Games Association website

Guernsey at the Commonwealth Games
Nations at the 2006 Commonwealth Games
Commonwealth Games